Jacobs Edo has been the System Coordinator for the OPEC Fund for International Development since 2010. He is notable for his work in enterprise systems architecture, including design, implementation, upgrades, enhancements and support for over a decade.

Education
Jacobs started his education from Edo College, Benin City in 1990 and earned a Bachelor of Engineering degree in Electrical Engineering from the University of Nigeria, Nsukka in 1998. He subsequently completed the Shell Intensive Training Programme (SITP) in Warri earning a specialization diploma in Information Technology issued by the Robert Gordon University, Aberdeen. With numerous SAP technologies and other important global certifications in the bag, Jacobs proceeded to receive in 2014 the Global Business Transformation Management (GTBM) Master's certification by SAP and the University of Applied Sciences and Arts Northwestern Switzerland's Business Transformation Academy. In 2015, he completed his master's degree in Telecommunication and Internet Technologies from the Technical University of Applied Sciences, Vienna. Jacobs is married with three children.

Career

Jacobs Edo is the author of the book “Digital Transformation: Evolving a digitally enabled Nigerian Public Service”, he is a co-founder of the Austrian-based DigTrans, Co-Chair, United Nation SAP Special interest Group, an association of Chief Information Officers(CIO) in international organizations including the World Bank, the chair of the Vienna Digital Transformation Meetup and Dean, Vienna School of AI.

As a volunteer Senior Digital Transformation Adviser at the Stanford Institute for Innovation in Developing Economies (Stanford SEED), he supports its vision of bringing the power of innovation, entrepreneurship, and leadership to established businesses in sub-Saharan Africa and their leaders on the ground and their communities

Jacobs is participating in more than 18 SAP implementation and has completed 4 full life cycle implementations. These implementations have been done across the oil and gas, consulting, banking, public sector, and NPO industries. Jacobs has an understanding of cloud computing, SDB, and NFV and is dedicated to reducing customers total cost of ownership and improving return on investment.

Causes
Jacobs was Second Vice President of Pengassan - NNPC/NAPIMS. He supports Edo College and gave a motivational career speech to students in March 2014. Jacobs is reported to be an active supporter of education, environment, disaster and humanitarian relief, poverty alleviation, and science and technology.

Publication
 Digital Transformation - Evolving a digitally enabled Nigerian Public Service.
Helping the hand that feeds

References

Nigerian businesspeople
Year of birth missing (living people)
Living people